Penopus is a genus of cusk-eels.

Species
There are currently two recognized species in this genus:
 Penopus japonicus J. G. Nielsen & Ohashi, 2011
 Penopus microphthalmus (Vaillant, 1888)

References

Ophidiidae